Eloeophila is a genus of crane fly in the family Limoniidae.

Species

E. aldrichi (Alexander, 1927)
E. aleator (Alexander, 1945)
E. amamiana (Alexander, 1956)
E. angolensis (Alexander, 1963)
E. angustior (Alexander, 1919)
E. apicata (Loew, 1871)
E. apicisetula Kato, 2021
E. apiculata (Alexander, 1919)
E. aprilina (Osten Sacken, 1860)
E. bicolorata (Alexander, 1958)
E. bifida (Alexander, 1921)
E. bipartita Stary, 2009
E. canidorsalis Kato, 2021
E. concreta (Edwards, 1933)
E. czernyi (Strobl, 1909)
E. delicola (Alexander, 1962)
E. delmastroi Stary, 2009
E. diacis (Alexander, 1972)
E. dietziana (Alexander, 1925)
E. dravidiana (Alexander, 1971)
E. dubiosa (Alexander, 1917)
E. dulitensis (Edwards, 1926)
E. edentata (Alexander, 1919)
E. enischnophallus Kato, 2021
E. fascipennis (Brunetti, 1912)
E. fumigata (Alexander, 1966)
E. fuscoanalis (Alexander, 1971)
E. granulata (Edwards, 1926)
E. hadrophallus Kato, 2021
E. igorota (Alexander, 1931)
E. irene (Alexander, 1927)
E. johnsoni (Alexander, 1914)
E. kintaro (Alexander, 1957)
E. laciniata (Edwards, 1928)
E. latinigra (Alexander, 1941)
E. lilliputina (Alexander, 1936)
E. lucasi Stary, 2009
E. maculata (Meigen, 1804)
E. marmorataeformis (Riedel, 1914)
E. marmorea (Alexander, 1934)
E. maroccana Stary, 2009
E. martinovskyi Stary, 2009
E. miliaria (Egger, 1863)
E. minor Stary, 2009
E. modoc (Alexander, 1946)
E. mundata (Loew, 1871)
E. nupta (Alexander, 1947)
E. ornata (Brunetti, 1912)
E. oxyacantha (Alexander, 1971)
E. paraprilina (Alexander, 1937)
E. pectinistylus Stary, 2009
E. perdilata (Alexander, 1966)
E. persalsa (Alexander, 1940)
E. pluriguttula (Alexander, 1966)
E. prolongata (Alexander, 1956)
E. punctulata Stary, 2009
E. pusilla (Kuntze, 1920)
E. sabrina (Alexander, 1929)
E. serenensis (Alexander, 1940)
E. serotinella (Alexander, 1926)
E. serrulata (Alexander, 1932)
E. seticellula (Alexander, 1938)
E. shannoni (Alexander, 1921)
E. similissima (Alexander, 1941)
E. smithersi (Alexander, 1958)
E. solstitialis (Alexander, 1926)
E. sparsipunctum Stary, 2009
E. subannulata (Alexander, 1946)
E. subaprilina (Alexander, 1919)
E. subdilata (Alexander, 1972)
E. submarmorata (Verrall, 1887)
E. suensoni (Alexander, 1926)
E. superlineata (Doane, 1900)
E. tergilobellus Kato, 2021
E. tigricosta Stary, 2009
E. trimaculata (Zetterstedt, 1838)
E. urania (Speiser, 1923)
E. ussuriana (Alexander, 1933)
E. venaguttula (Alexander, 1934)
E. vernata (Alexander, 1927)
E. verralli (Bergroth, 1912)
E. verrucosa Savchenko, 1976
E. villiersi (Alexander, 1958)
E. woodgatei (Alexander, 1946)

References

Limoniidae
Nematocera genera
Taxa named by Camillo Rondani